The men's mass start competition at the 2020 European Speed Skating Championships was held on 12 January 2020.

Results
The race was started at 17:20.

References

Men's mass start